Bahram Jerd (also Romanized as Bahrām Jerd) is a village in negar Rural District, negar District, Kerman County, Kerman Province, Iran. At the 2006 census, its population was 22, in 6 families.

References 

Populated places in Kerman County